The Divertimento in E major, K. 563, is a string trio, written by Wolfgang Amadeus Mozart in 1788, the year in which he completed his last three symphonies (nos. 39–41) and his "Coronation" Piano Concerto. It is his last divertimento and different from his other divertimenti not only in its instrumentation but also in its compositorial ambition and scope.

The work was completed in Vienna on September 27, 1788, and is dedicated to Michael von Puchberg, a friend and fellow Freemason, who lent money to Mozart. The premiere was in Dresden on April 13, 1789, with Anton Teyber taking the violin part, Mozart playing viola and Antonín Kraft playing cello. At the time Mozart was conducting a tour of German cities, on his way to Berlin (see Mozart's Berlin journey).

Movements

The work is in six movements:

Recorded performances of the Divertimento range from 41 to 50 minutes.

Critical reception
As Alfred Einstein writes in Mozart: His Character, His Work (and as excerpted in the notes to a Kennedy Center performance), Mozart's only completed string trio shares with most divertimenti this six-movement format, but from that no lightness of tone should be understood – rather, "it is a true chamber-music work, and grew to such large proportions only because it was intended to offer ... something special in the way of art, invention, and good spirits. ... Each instrument is primus inter pares, every note is significant, every note is a contribution to spiritual and sensuous fulfilment in sound." Einstein called it "one of his noblest works".

Mozart's Divertimento in E major is "one of a kind," according to the notes to an Emerson Quartet performance. "It is not only Mozart's only finished composition for string trio – it also appears to be the first such work by any composer." Though probably the first substantial work for the combination, it is not the first work written for string trio; there were works for violin, viola and cello written at least five years earlier, by Wenzel Pichl, and works for two violins and bass, probably based on the trio sonata, written much before that.

References

External links

, performed by members of the Takeuchi String Quartet.

Serenades and divertimenti by Wolfgang Amadeus Mozart
Compositions for string trio
1788 compositions
Compositions in E-flat major
Music dedicated to benefactors or patrons